Najite Dede is a director and a Nigerian actress in the Nollywood industry. She is a sibling to Michelle Dede and a cousin to Richard Mofe Damijo who are also into the film industry.

Early life and education 
Her father is Mr Brownson Dede, a Nigerian ex-diplomat to Ethiopia.

Career 
The Nollywood actress can act in all roles assigned to her which makes her one of the unique actresses in the Nollywood industry.

Filmography 
MTV Shuga
Prince of Savannah
Mamma Mia
Heartbeat the musical
High
All about Ere
Can of worms
Unbroken
Nigeria nuance
The upside Your Head Show 
It's her day
Bar Beach Blues 
Riona

Award 
African Magic Viewers Choice Award 2020 Best Actor nominee Efa Iwara and Najite Dede for the Unbroken.

See also 
Michelle Dede
Tope Oshin
Theresa Edem

References

External links 
Najite Dede IMDb

Living people
Year of birth missing (living people)
Nigerian film directors
Nigerian film actresses
21st-century Nigerian actresses
Nigerian women film directors
Nigerian television actresses